The Eau Claire station, otherwise known as the Chicago, St. Paul, Minneapolis & Omaha Railroad Depot was a historic railroad station located at 324 Putnam Street in Eau Claire, Wisconsin. The station was built in 1893 for the Chicago, St. Paul, Minneapolis & Omaha Railroad, a subsidiary of the Chicago and North Western Railway. The depot was designed by Charles Sumner Frost in the Richardsonian Romanesque style utilizing Lake Superior brownstone. Passenger service on the line was ceased in 1963.

The depot was added to the National Register of Historic Places on October 24, 1985. However, despite the depot being demolished in 1987, it continues to be listed on the NRHP.

References

 Taylor, M. Chicago & Northwestern Railroad Depot National Register of Historic Places Inventory-Nomination Form, 1981. On file at the National Park Service.

Railway stations on the National Register of Historic Places in Wisconsin
Railway stations in the United States opened in 1893
Former Chicago and North Western Railway stations
National Register of Historic Places in Eau Claire County, Wisconsin
Railway stations closed in 1963
Former railway stations in Wisconsin
Former Omaha Road stations